"Get 'Em Up" is a song by Canadian rock band Nickelback released as the seventh single, and third rock single, from their eighth studio album, "No Fixed Address" (2014) on May 5, 2015. It is the only track on the album written solely by lead vocalist Chad Kroeger. The song was initially released digitally as a promotional single on November 4, 2014.

Critical reception
Jeremy Thomas of 411 Mania complimented the band's use of humour in the song, writing that the track "has the same feel as "Animals," one of their better tracks, and that allows it to stand out." Mikael Wood of Los Angeles Times similarly wrote that "Get 'Em Up" is one of two tracks on the album that "show off Kroeger's flair for dialogue," which he added is "as funny and specific as high-level sitcom writing." Kerrang! described the track as "the best song about erectile dysfunction (we think) ever written."

Music video
The music video was directed by Nigel Dick and was released on June 25, 2015. It features a bank robbery gone wrong, with the main character portrayed as an antihero. The video's story is continued in the music video for "Satellite", released the same day.

Charts

Release history

References

2014 songs
2015 singles
Nickelback songs
Songs written by Chad Kroeger
Republic Records singles